The Hong Kong Games (HKG) is a multi sports event in Hong Kong which was first held in 2007 and has taken place every two years since then. All 18 districts of Hong Kong form the participating units for the Games.

Purpose 
The Hong Kong Games are held to provide more opportunities for participation, sharing and cooperation in sports in the community and to promote communication and friendship among the 18 districts. It also allows the relevant units to strengthen the cohesion of the community. Moreover, it promotes the idea of "sports for all" in the society in order to raise the standard of sports in Hong Kong.

Symbols
The emblem of the Games is composed of three rings resembling number "18" which symbolises the 18 participating districts in the Hong Kong Games. In addition, it also represents the three regions of Hong Kong: Hong Kong Island, Kowloon and the New Territories; on the other hand, it symbolises the partnership between the organiser, co-ordinator and co-organisers of the Games.  The thin lines next to the rings strengthen the feeling of motion and bespeak the vitality of the 18 districts. The colours red, orange-brown and blue represent the athlete's energy, indoor and outdoor games respectively.  The theme song of the Hong Kong Games, "Yan Yan Hei Dung" (人人起動) is sung by Joey Yung with Cheung Ka Seng (張家誠) as the composer and Adrian Chan as arranger.

Organiser 
The Sports Commission is the organiser for the Hong Kong Games, and the Community Sports Committee is the coordinator.  The 18 District Councils, the Leisure and Cultural Services Department, the Sports Federation & Olympic Committee of Hong Kong, China and the related sports associations are the co-organisers of the Games.

Qualification
The following are the core requirements as the qualification to participate in the Hong Kong Games:
 Must be nominated by their respective District Councils and participate in the competition in the name of the District Councils;
 Holders with valid Hong Kong identity card and have resided in Hong Kong for three years;
 In the area of their residence and only represent that district for competition;
 Athletes who are elected to represent Hong Kong in the multi sports game such as Olympics, Asian Games, World Championships or the Asian Championships are not allowed to participate;

List of Hong Kong Games

References

External links 
Official website

 
National multi-sport events
Multi-sport events in Hong Kong